Alexey Borisovich Parygin (born December 2, 1964 in Leningrad) is a Soviet and Russian artist, philosopher, art historian, art theorist and curator. Author of philosophical art projects: Contemplation of Money (1997-2000), Art is a Business (2000-2015), Art in the Forest (2000-2005), City as an Artist's Subjectivity (2019-2020), Posturbanism Art Project (since 2005).

Biography 
Alexey was born in Leningrad 2 of December 1964. His father Boris Parygin was a social psychologist. Alexey studied at the Graphics Faculty of the Herzen University from 1982–1989. He organized the art group “Union № 0” in Leningrad in 1986-1989 and created the art squatters’ workshop “Nevsky-25” in Leningrad in 1987–1990. Joined the Professional Artists’ Union of Russia in 1994, the Art Critics Association (ACA) member since 2003.
PhD in Art History with the thesis Silk Screening as a phenomenon of the 20th Century art (2002).

Since the mid-1980s, the artist perfected printed graphic technics of serigraphy, linocut, woodcut, lithography, cardboard engraving and collagraphy).
The artist's works are in many museum collections in Russia (State Catalogue of the Museum Fund of Russia) and the world.
The artist lives and makes art in his workshop at the Benois House (St. Petersburg, Russia).

The nature of creativity

In 1980-1990 Parygin concentrated on easel oil painting outside and using  models at the studio, experimented with various paint foundations such as canvas, plywood, glass and other media and used texture and relief techniques. 

From Aleksandr Kamensky’s article (1988):

From Mikhail German’s article (1991):

From the middle of the 90-ies the artist’s main studies subject matter and experiments became signs and sign systems as communicative link of the contemporary society. From 1997 the artist created a series of extended multimedia projects Contemplation of Money, Art is a Business, Art in the Forest.

From Nikolay Blagodatov's article (2002):

Since 2000, Parygin has been developing the utopian concept of the form of art after the death of art — Posturbanism Art Project / PostUrbanism.

Artist's books

Since 1989, Parygin has been contributing to artist's books. His first editions featured visual series of the author's poetic text: Pesok (The Sand). Leningrad. — 1989; Circulation — 5 numbered and signed copies; Tsvetnye zvuki (The Coloured Sounds). Leningrad. — 1989. Circulation — 5 numbered and signed copies; Zelenaia kniga (The Green Book). Leningrad. — 1989. Circulation — 6 numbered and signed copies; Moia mansarda (My Attic). Leningrad. — 1990. Circulation — 6 numbered and signed copies. And the artist’s book Krasnye karliki (The Red Dwarfs). Saint Petersburg. — 1990. Circulation — 8 numbered and signed copies.

From Elena Grigoryant’s article:

Spanning for three decades of featured art works the legacy holds about forty unique book objects. In the past decade the artist has participated several major group art editions: “Metamorphosis“. LS Collection Van Abbemuseum. – 2013; “Mayakovsky-Manifesto“. St. Petersburg – 2014.  ”Strannik Gumilëv” (Wanderer Gumilyov). – 2016; ”Jubilaeus”. LS Collection Van Abbemuseum. – 2018; ”Russkiy bukvar'” (Russian Alphabet book). M. – 2018; ”Poeziya neizvestnykh slov: Variatsii v kirillitse” (Poetry of Unknown Words: Variations in the Cyrillic alphabet). M. – 2019.

Museum collections

 British Library. (London).
 J. Paul Getty Museum. Getty Research Institute. (Los Angeles). 
 Princeton University Library. Rare Books and Special Collections Dept. (New Jersey).
 Van Abbemuseum. Russian book art collection LS (Albert Lemmens & Serge Stommels). (Eindhoven).
 Saxon State and University Library Dresden. (Dresden).
 Hamburg State and University Library Carl von Ossietzky. (Hamburg).
 National Museum, Warsaw. Cabinet of modern graphics and drawings. (Warsaw).
 A. Kasteyev State Museum of Arts. Graphics collection. (Almaty).
 National Library of Latvia. Fund graphics. (Riga).
 Latvian National Museum of Art. Arsenal/ Artist's Book Foundation. Science library. (Riga).
 Deering Library. Northwestern University. Artist Book Foundation. (Evanston, Illinois). 
 Chapin Library. Artist's Book Foundation. (Williamstown, Massachusetts).
 Kumu. Science Library. Tallinn.
 Luciano Benetton Collection Imago Mundi. Gallerie delle Prigioni. (Treviso).
 Alfredo Guati Rojo National Watercolor Museum. Mexico City.
 Museo de la Acuarela. (Toluca).
 Archivio di Comunicazione Visiva e Libri d’Artista. (Sicily).
 Mezinárodní portrétní galerie. (Tuzla).
 Остен музеј на цртеж. Skopje.
 Hermitage Museum. Science Library/ Rare Books and Manuscripts Dept. (St. Petersburg).
 Pushkin Museum. Science Library/ Rare Books Dept. (Moscow).
 Russian Museum. Department of engraving XVIII-XXI centuries. The contemporary photography sector; GRM Science Library/ Rare Books Sector (St. Petersburg).
 National Library of Russia. Department of Prints (St. Petersburg).
 Russian State Library. Department of Prints/ Artist's Book Foundation (Moscow).
 RAH Science Library. Rare Book Sector (St. Petersburg).
 Museum of Art of St. Petersburg of the 20th and 21st centuries. Saint Petersburg Manege. (St. Petersburg).
 State Museum of the History of St. Petersburg. (St. Petersburg).
 Anna Akhmatova Literary and Memorial Museum. (St. Petersburg).
 Russian State Archive of Literature and Art. (St. Petersburg).
 The Museum Complex The Universe of Water. (St. Petersburg).
 Peterhof State Museum-Reserve/ Benoit Family Museum. Russia.
 The Mayakovsky State Museum. (Moscow).
 The State Museum and Exhibition Center "ROSISO. Graphics collection. (Moscow).
 Russian State Library of Arts. (Moscow).
 State Darwin Museum. Graphics. (Moscow).
 State Fine Arts Museum of the Republic of Tatarstan. Graphics collection. (Kazan).
 Volgograd Museum of Fine Arts named after I. Mashkov. (Volgograd).
 P. M. Dogadin Astrakhan State Art Gallery. (Astrakhan).
 Bashkir Nesterov Art Museum. Graphics collection. (Ufa).
 Dagestan Museum of Fine Arts named after P. S. Gamzatova. (Makhachkala).
 Murmansk Regional Art Museum. Graphics collection. (Murmansk).
 Contemporary Fine Art Museum on Dimitrovsky Street. (Rostov on Don).
 Omsk Vrubel Museum of Fine Arts. Graphics collection. (Omsk).
 Liberov Center State Regional Art Museum. (Omsk).
 Lipetsk Museum of Decorative and Applied Arts. (Lipetsk).
 Krasnodar Kovalenko Art Museum. Graphics collection. (Krasnodar).
 Elabuz State Museum Reserve. Contemporary Graphics Foundation. (Elabuga).

Exhibitions
Since 1986, the artist participated in more than 250 exhibitions held in Russia (St. Petersburg, Moscow, Rostov-on-Donn, Kazan, Nizhny Novgorod, Kaluga, Arkhangelsk, Saratov, etc.).
The artist exhibited in the Netherlands in Groningen, Eindhoven; Germany in Kiel, Hamburg, Aachen; Italy in Naples, Rome, Caltanissetta; Spain in Bilbao; Montenegro in Bar; Latvia in Riga; Poland in Warsaw; China in Beijing; Mexico in Mexico City; India; Brazil in Bagé; Guatemala in San Pedro Carchá; Ethiopia in Addis Ababa and others.

Group projects
The artist participated in international art projects, festivals and open-air exhibits: “Kubachi Tower” (Kubachi, Amuzgi, Makhachkala / Dagestan, 2022); “Artisterium XII” (Kutaisi, Tbilisi/ Georgia, 2019); “Museum for Friends” (Lipetsk/ Russia, 2019); "Clouds" (Art-village Witland. Vistula Spit, 2018); “Printed Graphics” (Kazan, Sviyazhsk/ Tatarstan, 2016); “Crna Gora u o'ima ruskih slikara” (Bar/ Montenegro, 2012); “Warszawa w budowie — architektura XXI w malarstwie (Warsaw/ Poland, 2011) and others.

Principal Artist, Printmaking Studio, Timofey Markov Publishing House, St. Petersburg (2012-2014).
The artist worked on several joint publishing projects with Georgy Kovenchuk.

Group exhibitions

 Nuovi corpi nuove forme, Libri d’Artisti — Libri Oggetto (Dalla collezione Archivio di Comunicazione Visiva e Libri d’Artista). — Galleria Civica d'Arte di Palazzo Moncada. Caltanissetta. 2022.
 5ª Bienal Internacional de Gravura „Lívio Abramo“. — Casa da Cultura Luiz Antonio Marinez Corrêa. Araraquara. 2018 — 2019.
 OSTEN Biennial of Drawing. — National Gallery of Macedonia — Chifte Hammam. Skopje. North Macedonia. 2018
 E’CARTA Mini carte contemporanee. — MAiO Museo dell’Arte in Ostaggio e delle grafiche visionarie. Cassina de' Pecchi. 2018.
 Il PIACERE NEI LIBRI rassegna di arte erotica dagli ex libris ai libri d’artista. — Castel Nuovo. Naples. 2018.
 Sculture da Viaggio — omaggio a Bruno Munari. — Museo regionale interdisciplinare di Caltanissetta. Caltanissetta. 2017.
 Die Verwandlung. 25 Jahre russische Künstlerbücher. — Staats- und Universitätsbibliothek Hamburg. Hamburg. 2013 — 2014.
 V Bienal Internacional de la Acurela. — Mexico City. 2002 — 2003.
 Равноденствие. — Gallery Nevsky 20. Leningrad. 1991.
 Молодежная выставка. — Exhibition Hall of the Artists Union of Russia on Okhta. Leningrad. 1990.
 Без жури. — Exhibition Hall of the Artists Union of Russia on Okhta. Leningrad. 1989.
 Ленинград, история, люди (молодежная республиканская выставка). — Exhibition Hall of the Artists Union of Russia on Okhta. Leningrad. 1988.

Teaching
Teaching work since 1988.

Taught courses:
Drawing at the Department of Graphics and Sculptures Herzen University (2020-2021). Color science, printed graphics, research at the Department of Graphic Design at St. Petersburg State University of Industrial Technologies and Design (2018-2019). He taught layout, the basics of composition, and the foundations of sculpture at the Institute of Landscape Architecture Saint-Petersburg State Forestry University (2017-2019). Painting course and drawing course at the Department of Interior Design/ St. Petersburg State University of Industrial Technologies and Design (2003-2012), for which the concept of learning and working programs of the 1st in the 4th course was developed; painting course at the Design School, St. Petersburg, (2004-2009). Author's course Basics of examination of graphic works of art at the Department of Art Studies of St. Petersburg Humanitarian University of Trade Unions, the management of diploma works (1995-2001).

Bibliography

Texts by A. Parygin

Among the priority scientific interests of A. B. Parygin is the history of the techniques of the author's printed graphics, first of all — silk screening. Issues of the primacy of using silkscreen as an art technique; Regional schools and an early history of the process; The chronology and geography of its spread in the world; the interconnection of the latest currents and technological innovations in art. Silkscreen in the art of the United States and Canada and Cuba (1920-60s), in European art: Germany, England, France, Finland (1930-60s) and the USSR. Parygin is the author of Russia's first fundamental art research on the history and phenomenology of creative silk screening. The results are published in two monographs (2009, 2010).

Parygin is the author of Russia's first fundamental art research on the history and phenomenology of creative silk screening . The results are published in two monographs (2009, 2010). The author of more than 100 articles on the history of graphics and contemporary art, including the artists of St. Petersburg  (N.F. Lapshin, O.A. Lyagachev, Yu.K. Lyukshin, A. I. Kuindzhi, V.M. Konashevich, A.A. Korolchuk, M.A. Kopylkove, N.I. Kofanove, B.N. Koshelokhov, G.V. Kovenchuk, A.V. Kaplun, L.K. Kazbekove, T.S. Kerner and others) for the German academic directory Allgemeines Künstlerlexikon Die Bildenden Künstler aller Zeiten und Völker (AKL).

Monographs

 Parygin A.B. The Art of Silk Screening. The 20th century. History, Phenomenology, Techniques, Names. — St. Petersburg: ST. Petersburg GUTD, 2010. — 304 p. —  (RUS)
 Parygin A.B. Silk Screening As Art. Techniques, History, Phenomenology, Artists. — St. Petersburg: ST. Petersburg GUTD, 2009. — 261 p. —  (RUS)

Publications by A. Parygin
 Parygin Alexey A City as an Artist's Subjectivity / Artist’s Book Yearbook 2022-2023. Edited by Sarah Bodman. — Bristol: CFPR (Centre for Fine Print Research). University of the West of England, 2022. — 292 pp. 
 Parygin A. B. Постурбанизм как гипотеза. — St. Petersburg art notebooks, # 68, St. Petersburg: AIS, 2022. — P. 255-259.  (RUS)
 Parygin A. B. Созерцание денег (авторский комментарий к проекту). — St. Petersburg art notebooks, # 68, St. Petersburg: AIS, 2022. — P. 260-265.  (RUS)
 Parygin A. B. Искусство — это бизнес (авторский комментарий к проекту). — St. Petersburg art notebooks, # 68, St. Petersburg: AIS, 2022. — P. 248-254.  (RUS)
 Parygin Alexey "A City as the Artist's Subjectivity" is an Artist is a large Russian project in the livre d'artiste format // Book Arts Newsletter. — No. 140. Bristol: CFPR (Centre for Fine Print Research). University of the West of England, 2021, July — August. — P. 46-48. ISSN 1754-9086
 Parygin A. B. A City as an Artist’s Subjective Space / City as Artist's subjectivity. Artist's book project. Catalog. Authors of the articles: Parygin A.B., Markov T.A., Klimova E.D., Borovsky A.D., Severyukhin D.Ya., Grigoryants E.I., Blagodatov N.I. (Rus & En) — SPb: Ed. T. Markova. 2020. — 128 p. — S. 5. 
 Parygin A.B. Printed graphics between "yesterday" and "tomorrow" / Vs. Art. catalogue of "Printed Graphics of St. Petersburg Artists." St. Petersburg: SPb SH. 2020. — 192 p. P. 3–8.  (RUS)
 Parygin A. B. Posturbanism as a concept of the future // St. Petersburg art notebooks, # 53, St. Petersburg: AIS, 2019. — P. 236–238.  (RUS).
 Paryguine А. Idée et Manifeste [Posturbanisme] // Revue Trakt — Nu. 6; Juin 2018. — Paris. — pp. 26–28.  (French)
 Parygin A. B. Artist's Book as an art form / "The Art of Printed Graphics: History and Modernity." In Sat. Articles on the materials of the scientific conference Fourth Kazan Art Studies Readings November 19–20, 2015. Kazan: GMAI RT, 2015. — P. 75–78, il.  (RUS)
 Parygin A. B. Ljukšin, Jurij, Ljagačev, Oleg // Allgemeines Künstlerlexikon Die Bildenden Künstler aller Zeiten und Völker. — Walter de Gruyter. Band 85 — 2015, 540 p.  (German)
 Parygin A. B. Lapšin, Nikolaj; Kuindži, Archip // Allgemeines Künstlerlexikon Die Bildenden Künstler aller Zeiten und Völker. — Walter de Gruyter. Band 82 — 2014, 539 p.  (German)
 Parygin A. B. Konasevic, Vladimir; Korolcuk, Andrej; Kopylkov, Mikhail; Kofanov, Nikolaj // Allgemeines Künstlerlexikon Die Bildenden Künstler aller Zeiten und Völker. — Walter de Gruyter. Volume 81 — 2013, 540 p.  (German)
 Parygin A. The Bedbug — 2013. P. 140-165 / In the book: Georgy Kovenchuk (Gaga) draws "The Bedbug" (book-album) // Kovenchuk G., Borovsky A. — SPb: T. Markov Publishing House. — 2013, 160 p.  (RUS)
 Parygin A. B. Koselochov, Boris; Kovencuk, Georgij; Kovalskij, Sergei // Allgemeines Künstlerlexikon Die Bildenden Künstler aller Zeiten und Völker. — Walter de Gruyter. Volume 80 — 2013, 540 p.  (German)
 Parygin A. B. The birth of Russian silk screening  / Ural art and museum business: experience, problems, perspectives. Sat. Mat. Conf. All-Russian art readings of B. V. Pavlovsky's memory. EMIYA, 2011. Yekaterinburg. 2013. — pp. 194–198. (RUS)
 Parygin A. B. Moscow silkscreen 1950-2010 // Design. Materials. Technology. No 3 (28), St. Petersburg: SPb GUTD, 2013. — P. 77–82, Il. 1.	 (RUS)
 Parygin A. B. Kabacek, Leonid; Kacnelson, Grigory; Kaplun, Adrian; Kazbekov, Latif; Kerner, Tatjana // Allgemeines Künstlerlexikon Die Bildenden Künstler aller Zeiten und Völker. — Walter de Gruyter. Volume 79 — 2013, 535 p.  (German)
 Parygin A. B. Canadian Silk-Screen Project. (1942-1963) // St. Petersburg Art Notebooks, # 26, St. Petersburg: AIS, — 2013. — P. 228–230.  (RUS)
 Parygin A. B. Silk Screening in the Art of Post-War Germany // Design. Materials. Technology. No 2 (22), St. Petersburg: SPb GUTD, 2012. — P. 66-72, Il.  (RUS)
 Parygin A. B. The Picturesque Avant-garde of the XX century as a School // St. Petersburg State University of Technology and Design. — 2012. Series 3. No 1, St. Petersburg: SPb GUTD, 2012. — Pp. 88-92, Il.  (RUS)
 Parygin A. B. The First Steps of Creative Silk Screening in Russia // Design. Materials. Technology. No 2 (17), St. Petersburg: SPb GUTD, 2011. — P. 74-78, il.  (RUS)
 Parygin A. B. Course of painting and drawing at the Interior Department // St. Petersburg Art Notebooks, # 21, St. Petersburg: AIS, 2011. — P. 181-190.  (RUS)
 Parygin A. B. The First Steps of Creative Silk Screening  (serigraphy) in Europe // Design. Materials. Technology. No 3 (14), St. Petersburg: SPb GUTD, 2010. — P. 114-116, Il.  (RUS)

Critique
 Ekaterina Klimova A City as a Book / Artist’s Book Yearbook 2022-2023. Edited by Sarah Bodman. — Bristol: CFPR (Centre for Fine Print Research). University of the West of England. 2022. — 292 pp. 
 Wilkins, Caroline A vocal journey through the language of zaum // Journal of Interdisciplinary Voice Studies. Volume 4, Number 1, 1 April 2019, pp. 85-99 (15)
 Grigoryants El. Absorbing the Futurist heritage: Vasily Vlasov and Alexey Parygin / The Futurist Tradition in Contemporary Russian Artists’ Books // International Yearbook of Futurism Studies / Special Issue on Russian Futurism. Ed. by Günter Berghaus. — Berlin & Boston: Walter de Gruyter. Vol. 9 — 2019, 520 p. pp. 269–296. 
 Blagodatov N. Art is a search, search is an art. — Neva, No. 2, 2002. — P. 253—255. (RUS).
 Grigoryants E. I. Images by Alexei Parygin // St. Petersburg Panorama, 1993, No. 3. — P. 11. (RUS).
 Zhavoronkova S. M. Two artists are two worlds. — The Evening Petersburg, 1991, December 20. (RUS).
 Gorskaya M. In the hour of the equinox. — Leningradskaya Pravda, 1991, June 26. (RUS).
 Kamensky A. A. Что значит быть современным? Ответ на этот вопрос ищут молодые художники. (Review of two youth Leningrad's and Moscow's art exhibitions) // Pravda, 1988, September 9. (RUS)

Exhibition catalogs

 Imago Mundi/ Beyond the Black square. Contemporary Artists from St. Petersburg. Texts: Luciano Benetton, Liliana Malta, Gleb Ershov. — Treviso: Antiga Edizioni, 2021. — 480 pp. — P. 308-309. 
 III Международная триеннале современной графики в Новосибирске. Новосибирский государственный художественный музей. Novosibirsk: Изд-й дом «Вояж». — 2021. — 276 с.
 Second International Print Biennale (07.09—07.11.2019). Yerevan. — 2021. С. 357.
 A City as an Artist’s Subjective Space. Групповой проект в формате книги художника/ Каталог. Авт. вст. статей: Парыгин А. Б., Марков Т. А., Климова Е. Д., Боровский А. Д., Северюхин Д. Я., Григорьянц Е. И., Благодатов Н. И.. Под общей редакцией Парыгина А. Б. — Saint Petersburg: Изд. Т. Маркова. — 2020. — 128 с. 
 The Looking Glass and Through It. International art project. Catalog / Зеркала и зазеркалье. Международный выставочный проект. Каталог. МИСП. Авт. вст. статей: Толстая О., Шакирова Л., Пацюков В., Ипполитов А. Saint Petersburg: НП-Принт. — 2020. — 208 с.
 4-я Казанская международная биеннале печатной графики "Всадник". Каталог / Авт. вст. ст. О. Л. Улемнова. Kazan: Заман. — 2019. — 128 с.  
 IX Международная выставка Уральской триеннале печатной графики. Каталог / Авт. сост. И. Н. Оськина. Ufa. — 2019. — 216 с.
 Artisterium XII. Artisterium On the Road // Catalog (7 notebooks in the cover). Tbilisi: Artisterium. — 2019.
 Nuire № 5. Quatrième biennale internationale de poésie visuelle d’Ille sur Tet Catalogne nord // Catalog. Ille-sur-Têt. — 2019. — 95 p. P. 82.
 5ª Bienal Internacional de Gravura "Lívio Abramo" // Catalog. Araraquara. — 2019. — 23 p.
 OSTEN BIENNIAL of DRAWING Skopje 2018 // Catalog. Skopje: Остен музеј на цртеж — 2018. — 224 р. 
 V Фотобиеннале современной фотографии. Русский музей // Каталог. Saint Petersburg: Palace Editions, Russian Museum. — 2018. — 240 с.
 MicroMacroCosm // Catalog. Mumbai. IPEP — 2018. — 24 p.
 Il PIACERE NEI LIBRI rassegna di arte erotica dagli ex libris ai libri d’artista // Catalogo Biennale del libro d’artista IV Edizione. Napoli: Lineadarte, 2018. — 180 p.
 Third International Printmaking Biennial in Cacak // Catalog. Cacak. — 2018. — 105 р.
 “17. INTERBIFEP” Mezinárodní bienále festivalu portrétu // Catalog. Tuzla: Mezinárodní portrétní galerie Tuzla. — 2018. — 186 p.
 Die Verwandlung. 25 Jahre russische Künstlerbücher 1989—2013. LS collection Van Abbemuseum Eindhoven. Antje Theise, Klara Erdei, Diana Franssen. Eindhoven, 2013. — 120 p.
 黑龙江美术出版社(黑龍江美術出版社) Heilongjiang Fine Arts Publishing House. Harbin (哈尔滨). (中国). Chief Editor Chen Fenyue. Executive Chief Editor Catherine Druzhinin. V. 1. Graphics St. Petersburg. 2013. — 292 p.
 V Bienal Internacional de la Acurela. Articolo introduttivo: Dr. Gerardo Estrada, A. Guati Rojo. Mexico City, 2002. — 88 p.
 Петербург 95; Петербург 96; Петербург 97; Петербург 98; Петербург 2000; Петербург 2011. Авт. вст. ст.: Л. Скобкина. Saint Petersburg: Saint Petersburg Manege, 1996; 1997; 1998; 1999; 2001; 2012, ил.
 II-й Международный фестиваль экспериментальных искусств и перформанса/ Каталог. Авт. вст. ст.: Л. Скобкина. Saint Petersburg: Saint Petersburg Manege, 1998. — 63 с.
 Равноденствие// Буклет к выставке на Невском 20. — Автор вступит. ст. Юдина Т. К. Галерея ТСХ. Saint Petersburg., 1991.

References

External links

1964 births
Year of death missing
20th-century Russian painters
21st-century Russian painters
Anti-consumerists
Conceptual artists
Russian male painters
Russian watercolorists
Russian landscape painters
Russian printmakers
Russian illustrators
Russian contemporary artists
Russian art historians
Soviet painters
Artists from Saint Petersburg
Herzen University alumni
Academic staff of Herzen University
Residents of the Benois House